Castra of Duleu may refer to:
 Castra of Duleu - Odăi, a fort in the Roman province of Dacia
 Castra of Duleu - Cornet cetate, a fort in the Roman province of Dacia

See also
 List of castra